The 1997 Kent State Golden Flashes football team was an American football team that represented Kent State University in the Mid-American Conference (MAC) during the 1997 NCAA Division I-A football season. In their fifth and final season under head coach Jim Corrigall, the Golden Flashes compiled a 3–8 record (3–5 against MAC opponents), finished in a tie for fourth place in the MAC East, and were outscored by all opponents by a combined total of 490 to 337.

The team's statistical leaders included running back Astron Whatley with 876 rushing yards, quarterback Jose Davis with 2,707 passing yards, and wide receiver Eugene Baker with 1,549 receiving yards. Four Kent State players were selected as first-team All-MAC players: Whatley, Baker, offensive guard Bob Hallen, and offensive tackle Steve Zahursky.

Schedule

Roster

References

Kent State
Kent State Golden Flashes football seasons
Kent State Golden Flashes football